The 1997 Australian Men's Hardcourt Championships was a tennis tournament played on outdoor hard courts at the Memorial Drive Park in Adelaide in Australia and was part of the World Series of the 1997 ATP Tour. The tournament ran from 30 December 1996 through 5 January 1997.

Finals

Singles

 Todd Woodbridge defeated  Scott Draper 6–2, 6–1
 It was Woodbridge's 1st title of the year and the 53rd of his career.

Doubles

 Patrick Rafter /  Bryan Shelton defeated  Todd Woodbridge /  Mark Woodforde 6–4, 1–6, 6–3
 It was Rafter's 1st title of the year and the 5th of his career. It was Shelton's only title of the year and the 4th of his career.

External links
 ATP Tournament Profile

Australian Men's Hardcourt Championships
Next Generation Adelaide International
Hard
1990s in Adelaide
December 1996 sports events in Australia
January 1997 sports events in Australia